Arcel is a surname. Notable people with the surname include:

Ray Arcel (1899–1994), American boxing trainer
 (born 1963), Danish actress
Nikolaj Arcel (born 1972), Danish director and screenwriter